San Dionisio Ocotlan  is a town and municipality in Oaxaca in south-western Mexico. The municipality covers an area of 20.41 km2. 
It is part of the Ocotlán District in the south of the Valles Centrales Region

The town was founded by the Spanish in 1526  and its name roughly translates to the "land between the pines" in Nahuatl.

As of 2005, the municipality had a total population of 1093.

References

Municipalities of Oaxaca